Deportivo Galicia Fútbol Club (later Galicia de Aragua) was a traditional football club from Venezuela.

Founded in Caracas, the club moved, in 2002, to Maracay, in the state of Aragua, when its name changed to Galicia de Aragua, playing their home games at the Giuseppe Antonelli stadium in Maracay. Coached by the Uruguayan national Carlos MarÍa Ravel, the team switched from their traditional blue and white colours to the state's yellow and red and changed their name to Galicia de Aragua.

At the end of the 2001–02 season, Deportivo Galicia was relegated to the Venezuelan Segunda Division. In January 2002 they became a separate entity Aragua F.C. when they moved to Estadio Olímpico Hermanos Ghersi Páez.

Deportivo Galicia had Caracas as main training city, allowing many young prospects to play for this team, looking to get exposed in the league. Some of the solid players that were part of the squad that moved on to other bigger club as players and/or managers are: Edson Tortolero, Alejandro Clemente, Pedro Delgado, Stalin Rivas, Fernando Clemente, Pedro Millán, Ángel Rivillo, Hugo Savarese and Ramón López.

Titles
Primera División Venezolana: 4
Amateur Era (0):
Professional Era (4): 1964, 1969, 1970, 1974

Segunda División Venezolana: 3
1988, 1992, 2001

Tercera División Venezolana: 1
2000

Copa de Venezuela: 5
1966, 1967, 1969, 1979, 1981

Copa Simón Bolívar: 1
1971

Performance in CONMEBOL competitions
Copa Libertadores: 9 appearances

1965: First Round
1967: First Round
1968: First Round

1970: First Round
1971: First Round
1975: First Round

1976: First Round
1979: First Round
1980: First Round

Matches

Footnotes

A.  Points were taken from Deportivo Galicia due to irregularities in their line-up. Peñarol was awarded the points. Peñarol advanced due to goal difference.

Association football clubs established in 1985
Association football clubs disestablished in 2002
Football clubs in Venezuela
Defunct football clubs in Venezuela
1985 establishments in Venezuela